Minuscule 2060 (in the Gregory-Aland numbering), Av42 (von Soden), is a Greek minuscule manuscript of the New Testament, on 105 parchment leaves (27.5 by 21 cm). It is dated by a colophon to the year 1331. Gregory labelled it by 153r, Scrivener by 114r.

Description 

The codex contains the Book of Revelation with homilies of St. John Chrysostom to the Gospel of John, and the Revelation commentary by Andrew of Caesarea, altogether 369 leaves. Its text is written in one column per page, in 21 lines per page. Revelation is at the end (pages 265–369).

Kurt Aland did not place its biblical Greek text in any Category.
It was not examined by the Claremont Profile Method.

The text of the codex was collated by Hoskier.

The manuscript is currently housed at the Vatican Library (Ms. 542) in Rome.

See also 

 List of New Testament minuscules
 Biblical manuscript
 Textual criticism

References

Further reading 

 Herman C. Hoskier, "Concerning the Text of the Apocalypse" 1 (London, 1929), pp. 381-388. 
 Bruce M. Metzger, "Manuscripts of the Greek Bible" (New York: Oxford, 1981), pp. 132-133.

External links 

 Image from minuscule 2060 
 

Greek New Testament minuscules
14th-century biblical manuscripts